Daniela Ryf (born 29 May 1987) is a Swiss triathlete. She is the titles holder of the Ironman World Championship of 2015, 2016, 2017, 2018 and 2021; and of the Ironman 70.3 World Championship of the 2014, 2015, 2017, 2018, and 2019.

Ryf competed for Switzerland in the Triathlon at the Summer Olympics of 2008 (7th) and 2012 (40th). In 2010, Ryf placed third in the inaugural 2010 ITU Sprint Distance Triathlon World Championships.

References

External links

1987 births
Living people
Swiss female triathletes
Olympic triathletes of Switzerland
Triathletes at the 2008 Summer Olympics
Triathletes at the 2012 Summer Olympics
People from Solothurn
Sportspeople from the canton of Solothurn
20th-century Swiss women
21st-century Swiss women
Ironman world champions